The 2016 Lithuanian Football Cup was the twenty-eighth season of the Lithuanian annual football knock-out tournament.

This season was the first time the tournament was played during a single calendar year since the regulations changed in 2007, and the final was played in September 2016.

The winners will qualify for the first qualifying round of the 2017–18 UEFA Europa League.

First round 

!colspan="3" align="center"|7 May

|-
!colspan="3" align="center"|11 May

|-
!colspan="3" align="center"|14 May

|}

Second round 

!colspan="3" align="center"|10 May

|-
!colspan="3" align="center"|18 May

|-
!colspan="3" align="center"|21 May

|-
!colspan="3" align="center"|24 May

|-
!colspan="3" align="center"|25 May

|-
!colspan="3" align="center"|26 May

|-
!colspan="3" align="center"|31 May

|-
!colspan="3" align="center"|1 June

|-
!colspan="3" align="center"|3 June

|-
!colspan="3" align="center"|4 June

|}

Round of 32 

!colspan="3" align="center"|8 June

|-
!colspan="3" align="center"|11 June

|-
!colspan="3" align="center"|12 June

|-
!colspan="3" align="center"|16 June

|-
!colspan="3" align="center"|18 June

|-
!colspan="3" align="center"|19 June

|}

Round of 16 

!colspan="3" align="center"|29 June

|-
!colspan="3" align="center"|5 July

|-
!colspan="3" align="center"|6 August

|-
!colspan="3" align="center"|7 August

|}

Quarter-finals  

!colspan="3" align="center"|20 August

|}

Semi-finals  

!colspan="3" align="center"|10 September

|-
!colspan="3" align="center"|11 September

|}

Final 
The final took place on 25 September 2016, in the Central Stadium of Klaipėda

|}

References

External links

Cup
2015–16 European domestic association football cups
2016–17 European domestic association football cups
2016